Desmia recurvalis is a moth in the family Crambidae. It was described by Schaus in 1940. It is found in Cuba and Puerto Rico.

References

Moths described in 1940
Desmia
Moths of the Caribbean